Baia de Santa Marta, also known as Baía das Luciras or Espiegle Bay, is a bay in Angola. It is located in the Namibe Province.

Geography
The Baia de Santa Marta is a bay of the Atlantic Ocean located in a small stretch of the Angolan coast where the shore turns sharply east for about 10 km and then north again. The bay is facing northwest and the small town of Lucira is located on its shores. The northern headland is Ponta da Bissonga and the eastern one Ponta Branca.

See also
 List of lighthouses in Angola
 Geography of Angola

References

Bays of the Atlantic Ocean
Bays of Angola
Lighthouses in Angola